Chris Oliver is a retired Edinburgh orthopaedic surgeon and professor and was the King James IV Professor at the Royal College of Surgeons of Edinburgh 2019-20. Associate Research Fellow at the School of Engineering and Built Environment, Transport Research Institute, Edinburgh Napier University 2018-21. Honorary Professor in Physical Activity for Health at the Physical Activity for Health Research Centre, University of Edinburgh 2015-18. Consultant trauma orthopaedic and hand surgeon at Royal Infirmary of Edinburgh 1997-17.

Education
In 1992, Oliver completed a doctorate (MD) from University College London in spinal muscle physiology and artificial intelligence.

Career
Oliver retired due to ill health in 2018 from the Royal Infirmary of Edinburgh as a consultant trauma orthopaedic surgeon in the Department of Trauma and Orthopaedics, University of Edinburgh. Career was profiled by the British Medical Journal, Careers  in July 2018. The Gold Medal Lecture, given at Old Oswestrian's June 2021.

Between 2015-2018 he was honorary Professor of Physical Activity for Health to Physical Activity for Health Research Centre (PAHRC) at the University of Edinburgh.

In October 2016, along with other academics, he signed a letter to the Medical Schools Council and the General Medical Council to highlight the lack of lifestyle education in undergraduate medical curricula across the United Kingdom.

Published work 
Oliver claims to have authored over 400 publications and presentations. He has written about medical informatics, assessment in medical education, physical activity and orthopaedic surgery.

He was a section editor in the multi-author major trauma section of Oxford Textbook of Fundamentals of Surgery. published in July 2016.

Personal life 
Oliver gained excessive weight during his adult life and at his heaviest was 171 kg (27 stone). In February 2007, he had a LapBand fitted laparoscopically and, by 2011, his weight reduced to 102 kg (12 stone). In 2014, the band snapped and it was later removed. In November 2020, he had an endoscopic gastric bypass.

Oliver is an avid endurance cyclist. In 2013, he cycled 3,415 miles from Los Angeles to Boston, USA, with his daughter, Catherine. 

In 2021, Oliver faced charges of indecent exposure during an altercation with a neighbouring property.  He was sentenced by the court and fined £400.

References 

 
 Profile University of Edinburgh Research Explorer
 National Library of Medicine

Academics of the University of Edinburgh
1960 births
Living people
Scottish surgeons
Scottish scholars and academics
People from Forest Gate
21st-century Scottish medical doctors
Fellows of the Royal College of Physicians of Edinburgh
Fellows of the Royal College of Surgeons of Edinburgh
British orthopaedic surgeons